Drest Gurthinmoch was a king of the Picts from 480 to 510.

The Pictish Chronicle king lists all give him a reign of 30 years between Nechtan and Galan. The meaning of the epithet Gurthinmoch is unknown, but the first part may be related to the Welsh gwrdd, meaning great, and perhaps moch in this case correlates with the same word in Welsh which means pig.

References
 Anderson, Alan Orr, Early Sources of Scottish History A.D 500–1286, volume 1. Reprinted with corrections. Paul Watkins, Stamford, 1990.

External links
Pictish Chronicle 

510 deaths
Pictish monarchs
6th-century Scottish monarchs
Year of birth unknown
5th-century Scottish monarchs